50 United Nations Plaza is a high-rise residential building in Manhattan, New York City. The 44-story tower was designed by the architectural firm Foster and Partners, making it the first residential building in the United States designed by Norman Foster, Baron Foster of Thames Bank. It includes 87 apartments.

History
The vacant lot was acquired by Zeckendorf Development for US$160 million in 2007. On November 14, 2012, Zeckendorf family announced the beginning of construction, alongside Israeli billionaire investor Eyal Ofer as a partner.

Tenants 
The government of Qatar acquired four apartments in April 2015. By July 2015, the penthouse, which has an outdoors swimming-pool, was listed on the real estate market for US$70 million.

After previously leasing a penthouse at the Waldorf-Astoria hotel for its Ambassador to the United Nations, the United States government relocated the ambassadorial residence to 50 United Nations Plaza. The United States initially rented a 40th floor penthouse apartment, but later purchased a different penthouse on the 37th floor. Nikki Haley was the first ambassador to reside in the 40th floor penthouse, which rented at $58,000 per month. The 37th floor five-bedroom, six-and-a-half-bath penthouse was purchased in May 2019 for $15.85 million.

On March 15, 2019 the British Government acquired a penthouse in 50 United Nations Plaza, for their trade commissioner for North America and consul general in New York, Antony Phillipson, for $16m.

References

Condominiums and housing cooperatives in Manhattan
Residential buildings completed in 2015
Foster and Partners buildings
Residential skyscrapers in Manhattan